Reginaldo Manoel da Silva Júnior (born 8 July 1992), is a Brazilian footballer who plays for Chapecoense as a defender.

Club career
Born in Barretos, Reginaldo started his youth career at the academy of Rio Preto Esporte Clube (playing as a forward) before switching to the Fluminense academy in 2011. In 2013, he was loaned out to Resende Futebol Clube and subsequently had loan spells at Clube Esportivo Bento Gonçalves, Clube Atlético Metropolitano and at Finnish club FF Jaro.

On 30 December 2015, Reginaldo was loaned to Série B club Vila Nova Futebol Clube. An undisputed starter; he played 46 matches for the squad and also acted as a captain during the last two rounds of the league.

After returning to Flu in 2017, Reginaldo broke into the main team as a replacement for Ygor Nogueira, after the latter received marching orders. Although he was a starter during the first half of the season; he was soon dropped from the squad after having suffered a muscle injury and was replaced by the pair of Henrique and Renato Chaves. Reginaldo contributed with two goals in 25 matches during the season.

On 20 April 2018, Reginaldo joined second tier club Ponte Preta on a loan deal for the rest of the season. On 5 May, he scored his first goal for the club in a 3–2 victory over Guarani.

Career statistics

References

External links

1992 births
Living people
Association football defenders
Brazilian footballers
Fluminense FC players
Resende Futebol Clube players
Clube Atlético Metropolitano players
Clube Esportivo Bento Gonçalves players
FF Jaro players
Vila Nova Futebol Clube players
Associação Atlética Ponte Preta players
Botafogo Futebol Clube (SP) players
Clube de Regatas Brasil players
Associação Chapecoense de Futebol players
Campeonato Brasileiro Série A players
Campeonato Brasileiro Série B players
Campeonato Brasileiro Série D players
Veikkausliiga players
Expatriate footballers in Finland
Brazilian expatriate footballers
People from Barretos